Anis Ahmed (born 11 June 1947) is a retired Pakistan Armed Forces brigadier and Sitara-i-Imtiaz recipient who has served in the Pakistan military for 36 years. Born in Lahore Pakistan he is an authority on geopolitics and military history.

Anis has held notable offices including Deputy Commandant Pakistan Military Academy, Deputy Director General Pakistan Rangers, Senior Instructor Command and Staff College, Managing Director National Fertilizer Marketing Limited, Chairman Punjab Privatisation Board and Chief Advisor to Government of Punjab. Anis chairs various non-profit organisations and is the Chairman Board of Management at Shalimar Hospital.

References

1947 births
Living people
Pakistani military leaders
Recipients of Sitara-i-Imtiaz